Marko Grubelić (born 23 September 1980) is a Serbian footballer.

Born in Belgrade, SR Serbia, he had previously played for Serbian clubs FK Zemun, FK Milicionar, FK Radnički Obrenovac and FK Rad, and Ukrainian clubs FC Metalurh Donetsk and FC Stal Alchevsk. During 2010 he played with Russian First Division club FC Volgar Astrakhan on loan. Grubelić retired from professional football in 2013, but due to his assistant role in Bežanija, he used to be a player-coach in the 2016–17 Serbian First League, but failed to play any official match.

References

External links
 
 

1980 births
Living people
Footballers from Belgrade
Serbian footballers
Serbian expatriate footballers
Ukrainian Premier League players
FK Zemun players
FK Milicionar players
FK Radnički Obrenovac players
FK Rad players
FC Metalurh Donetsk players
Expatriate footballers in Ukraine
Serbian expatriate sportspeople in Ukraine
FK Bežanija players
FC Stal Alchevsk players
FC Volgar Astrakhan players
Expatriate footballers in Russia
Association football defenders
Serbian First League players